Mae Sai is a tambon (subdistrict) of Mae Sai District, in Chiang Rai Province, Thailand. In 2020 it had a total population of 30,338 people.

History
The subdistrict was created effective November 8, 1936 by splitting off 7 administrative villages from Pong Pha.

Administration

Central administration
The tambon is subdivided into 13 administrative villages (muban).

Local administration
The area of the subdistrict is shared by 2 local governments.
the subdistrict municipality (Thesaban Tambon) Mae Sai (เทศบาลตำบลแม่สาย)
the subdistrict municipality (Thesaban Tambon) Mae Sai Mittraphap (เทศบาลตำบลแม่สายมิตรภาพ)

References

External links
Thaitambon.com on Mae Sai

Tambon of Chiang Rai province
Populated places in Chiang Rai province